Huachipato is census district and neighbourhood in Talcahuano Commune, part of the conurbation of Greater Concepción in the Biobío Region of southern Chile. It is the industrialized part of the commune supporting a steel mill and oil refinery.

Etymology
The word huachipato is a Mapuche word meaning "a trap to catch birds". It may be the result of a mixture of Spanish and Mapuche, where the local name for a snare is huache or  huachi.

Demographics
The district is completely urban and had a population of 9,665 as of the 2002 census with 2,415 housing units.

History
Because of the high cost of pig iron from the aging steel mill in Corral, the Chilean Development Corporation (CORFO) decided to support building a new steel mill in Huachipato. Compañía de Acero del Pacífico was formed and began construction in 1947. The mill now named "Siderúrgica Huachipato" was completed in 1950. From the 1960s to the 1990s the mine of El Romeral provided most of the iron to the mill.

The same year that construction of the steel mill started, a football club, Club Deportivo Huachipato, was founded. As their initial fans were employees of the local steel company, they adopted the nickname Acereros ("Steelers").

In 1966 Empresa Nacional del Petróleo (ENAP) opened an oil refinery in Huachipato.

References

Populated places in Concepción Province